Nogometni klub Serdica, commonly referred to as NK Serdica or simply Serdica, is a Slovenian football club which plays in the village of Serdica. Their colours are black and white. They play in the 1. MNL, the fifth tier of the Slovenian football pyramid. The club was founded in 1974. Their home ground is Ob Ledavi Stadium.

The club has built a rivalry with NK Goričanka from Rogašovci mainly due to close proximity to the town Serdica. Matches between the two teams are known as the "Goričko derby".

History

Approximately 40 people got together on 21 April 1974 to establish a football club in Serdica. The same day, Karel Horvat was elected as the first club president.

The club's best achievement in the Slovenian Football Cup are two appearances in the first round, first in the 1994–95 season when they were defeated at home by NK Mura with the score of 9–1 in front of more than 1,000 spectators, which is also the club's highest home attendance. In the 1997–98 season they were eliminated in the first round away by Triglav Kranj with an 8–0 defeat. Serdica lost to Mura 05 in the MNZ Murska Sobota Cup final but still qualified for the preliminary round of the 2009–10 Slovenian Cup where they were defeated 8–4 by Železničar Maribor.

They competed in the 1. MNL for most of their early years. They finished fifth consecutively in the 2002–03 and the 2003–04 seasons. The 2004–05 season was one of the best in the club's history as they were in the title race before finishing third. They finished fifth again in the 2005–06 season.

For the 2006–07 season the club was in a relegation battle with Cankova and finished ninth, thus avoiding relegation by four points. In the 2007–08 season Serdica were in the title race for the entire season but were defeated on the last match day by Hodoš with the score of 2–0 and failed to promote to the Pomurska League. The next season the team finished mid-table above their rivals Goričanka who gets relegated.

In the 2009–10 season the team was in a relegation battle again and avoided drop by four points. The 2010–11 season was one of the best for the club in the fifth tier as they were contesting for promotion but finished third behind Beltinci and Apače. In the 2011–12 season the team was in the title race again but finished third beating the league winners on the last match day.

In the 2012–13 season the club finished second and was one point behind league winners Bakovci. They scored a total of 93 goals and conceded 29. Because Pomurska League was discontinued they stayed in 1. MNL, but were effectively promoted from the fifth tier to the fourth tier. In the 2013–14 season they finished top of the league in the fourth tier and promoted to the Slovenian Third League together with Mura and Bakovci. In the 2014–15 season though, they won only one match and drawn five times for a total of eight points and finished as league bottomers, quickly relegating back to the fourth tier.

The club finished fifth in the 1. MNL (fourth tier) consecutively in the 2015–16 and 2016–17 seasons.

Honours

Slovenian Fourth Division
 Winners: 2013–14

League history since 1991

References

External links
Official website 

Football clubs in Slovenia
Association football clubs established in 1974
1974 establishments in Slovenia